Esther Ouwehand (born 10 June 1976) is a Dutch politician and former marketing manager serving as leader of the Party for the Animals (PvdD) and its parliamentary group in the House of Representatives since 2019. She has been a member of the House of Representatives since the 2006 election with two interruptions.

Biography

Personal life 
Esther Ouwehand went to secondary school in Katwijk, where she finished her vwo (Dutch pre-university education). 
She studied "Policy, communication and organisation" at the Vrije Universiteit Amsterdam, which she did not finish.

Ouwehand is married and currently resides in Leiden.

She was raised a Protestant but is currently an agnostic. She is vegan.

Dutch webzine Lords of Metal conducted an interview with Esther Ouwehand in which she told about her deep rooted passion for hard rock and heavy metal music, in particular stoner metal.

Career 
Initially, she did not consider a career in politics. She left a promising career in marketing, being junior marketing manager for youth magazines at Sanoma. She has additional functions as a committee member for youth centre "De Schuit" and the foundation "Factor Welzijn" in Katwijk.

Party for the Animals 
She joined the Party for the Animals in October 2002 and became the party's co-ordinator in 2004. She was responsible for the management of the party's headquarters. She also co-authored the 2006 electoral program "220x liever..".

The general elections of 2006 were considered a great success for the party. The party gained 179,988 votes (1.8%), enough for two seats in the Dutch parliament. The party became the world's first party to gain parliamentary seats with an agenda focused primarily on animal rights.

She was second on the election list, right after party chairwoman Marianne Thieme. Consequently, she became a member of parliament, even though she received a total of 4.370 write-in votes, about a hundred less than lijstduwer Kees van Kooten, who received 4.479 votes. She was sworn in on 30 November 2006.

Contrary to her wishes she was not initially placed on the election list for the general elections of 2010, but the party members voted her on the second place, so she became re-elected.

Ouwehand temporarily resigned from the House on 17 November 2015 for health reasons and was replaced by Frank Wassenberg. She returned to the House on 18 October 2016.

On 8 October 2019, Ouwehand succeeded Marianne Thieme as parliamentary leader of the PvdD upon Thieme's retirement from the House of Representatives.

Electoral history

Bibliography 
 220x liever voor mens, dier, natuur en milieu: Verkiezingsprogramma Partij voor de Dieren, Tweede Kamerverkiezingen 2006. Esther Ouwehand c.s., Amsterdam, October 2006

See also
 List of animal rights advocates

References 
  Parlement.com biography

External links 

  Esther Ouwehand's weblog
  House of Representatives biography
  Perdefinitie.nl biography

1976 births
Living people
21st-century Dutch politicians
21st-century Dutch women politicians
21st-century Dutch women writers
Dutch agnostics
Dutch bloggers
Dutch women activists
Marketing women
Members of the House of Representatives (Netherlands)
Party for the Animals politicians
People from Katwijk
Dutch women bloggers
20th-century Dutch women